Constituency WR-13 is a reserved seat for women in the Khyber Pakhtunkhwa Assembly.

2013
Najma Shaheen

See also
 Constituency PK-37 (Kohat-I)
 Constituency PK-38 (Kohat-II)
 Constituency PK-39 (Kohat-III)
 Constituency WR-09

References

Khyber Pakhtunkhwa Assembly constituencies